Themes For Great Cities – Definitive Collection 79-81 is an American-only compilation album by Simple Minds. It was released on 1 November 1981 by Stiff Records. At the time, the only Simple Minds album released in the US was Life in a Day and this was designed to introduce the American audience to their other albums (which would soon be issued there by Virgin).

Track listing

Personnel
Charles Burchill – guitars
Derek Forbes – bass
Brian McGee – drums
Michael MacNeil – keyboards
Jim Kerr – vocals

References

Themes For Great Cities – Definitive Collection 79-81 at the Official Site.

Albums produced by Steve Hillage
1981 compilation albums
Simple Minds compilation albums
Stiff Records compilation albums